Dan Payne (born 1972) is a Canadian actor.

Dan Payne may also refer to:

Dan Payne (Canadian football) (born 1966), Canadian football player, wrestler
Dan Payne (rugby union) (born 1972), American rugby player, coach, and administrator

See also
Danny Payne (1957–2005), American footballer
Daniel Payne (1811–1893), American bishop and educator
Daniel Payne (cricketer) (born 1978), Australian cricketer
Daniel Panetta (born 1992), also known as Danny Payne, Canadian singer